Bill Bailey (born September 2, 1938), is an American actor and author, primarily providing supporting roles in film and television throughout the 1970s, 1980s and 1990s. He appeared in Superman (1978), Superman II (1980), and Haunted Honeymoon (1986), as well as a number of British television programs including Yes, Prime Minister (1987), Jeeves and Wooster (1992), and Agatha Christie's Poirot (1993). He has also narrated an abridged version of Herman Melville's novel "Moby Dick".

A number of Internet databases have misattributed his work to the British comedian Bill Bailey.

Life and career

Bailey was born in a small rural town in North Carolina and attended Sanford Central High School. He graduated from the University of North Carolina in 1960 with a degree in philosophy, spent some time in the US Army, and then as prison guard in Canada. He married a Texan heiress, and moved to Houston, Texas where he managed a ranch and took part in motorbike scrambling and sports car rallying. He worked as a bouncer, and later organised the first white collar union in the US meat-packing industry. Soon after taking up acting he moved to London in 1968 and within a year of his arrival he became the first full-frontal male nude on the British stage at the Almost Free Theatre, London. He has acted in film, television and on London's West End stage.

He is the author of seven published books, most notably Taping Whores (2004).

Bibliography

Split Infinities, 2000, 
Rolling Thunder, 2001, 
Comedians of Violence, 2003, 
Taping Whores, 2004, .
Times Two, 2004, 
Is Alice?, 2009, 
The Ghost Society, 2009,

Filmography

Theatre appearances

References

External links
 

1938 births
Living people
Writers from North Carolina
People from Sanford, North Carolina
American male actors
People from Colchester
University of North Carolina alumni